Corner Rock is a rock lying about midway between Galindez Island and Corner Island at the southeast entrance to Meek Channel, in the Argentine Islands of the Wilhelm Archipelago. It was charted and named in 1935 by the British Graham Land Expedition under John Rymill.

References
 

Rock formations of the Wilhelm Archipelago